Clifton Springs is the name of several places,

 Clifton Springs, New York, a village located within Ontario County, New York, USA
 Clifton Springs, Victoria, a coastal town overlooking Corio Bay, approximately 20 km east of Geelong, Victoria, Australia
 Clifton Springs at Overlook Park (Oviedo, Florida)